Sulmierzyce  is a town in Krotoszyn County, Greater Poland Voivodeship, Poland, located southeast of Poznań, at .

It is the birthplace of famous Polish poet Sebastian Klonowic.

Cities and towns in Greater Poland Voivodeship
Krotoszyn County
Poznań Voivodeship (1921–1939)